The International Dance Council (CID, standing for French: Conseil International de la Danse) is the umbrella organization for all forms of dance in the world.  It is a non-profit international non-governmental organization founded in 1973 "under the auspices of UNESCO as a forum for the exchange of ideas and developments in dance".  It is based in Paris within the UNESCO headquarters.  CID advises the UNESCO, national and local governments, international organizations and institutions. Among its major programs are:

 International Dance Day 
 Global Dance Directory
 International Certification of Dance Studies
 World Congress on Dance Research

It is open for membership to organizations (federations, dance schools, dance companies, festivals, competitions) as well as individuals with sufficient credentials. It has more than 10,000 members in over 170 countries.

References

External links
 The International Dance Council Records at the New York Public Library
 CID Portal
 CID World

UNESCO
International organizations based in France

Dance organizations
International cultural organizations